"It isnae me" is a poem by Sally Holmes which was set to music by the English composer Edward Elgar in 1930.

The poem was first printed in Country Life magazine, and the song published in 1931 by Keith Prowse & Co. Ltd, London.

It was written at Elgar's home, "Marl Bank", near Worcester, and was dedicated to the soprano Joan Elwes, whom he had admired at Three Choirs Festival. The poem was performed by her in October 1930 at a concert in Dumfries, Scotland.

The poem is in the Scots language.

Lyrics

Scots translations
 = grieving, complaining
 = sad
 = meanwhile
 = remembering
 = little, young
 = meadow-ridge   
 = gave myself
 = cry
 = ago
 = don't know

Recordings

"The Unknown Elgar" includes "" performed by Teresa Cahill (soprano), with Barry Collett (piano).
Songs and Piano Music by Edward Elgar has "" performed by Mark Wilde (tenor), with David Owen Norris (piano).

References

External links

Songs by Edward Elgar
Scots language
1930 songs